F-factor may refer to:
 F-factor (conversion factor), a conversion unit used in diagnostic radiology
 Fertility factor (bacteria), a sequence of bacterial DNA
 F-Factor (diet)